Steelberg is a surname. Notable people with the surname include:

Chad Steelberg, American businessman
Eric Steelberg (born 1977), American cinematographer
Ryan Steelberg, American businessman